The 2018 Taça 12 de Novembro is the 6th staging of the Taça 12 de Novembro. The season began on 26 September 2018 and was finished in the final match on 20 October 2018.

The draw of the tournament was held on 22 September 2018.

Teams
A total of 20 teams compete in the tournament: eight teams from 2018 LFA Primeira and twelve teams from 2018 LFA Segunda

Preliminary round

Round of 16

Quarter-finals

Semi-finals

Final

References

External links
Official website
Official Facebook page
Taça 12 de Novembro 2018, RSSSF.com

Taça 12 de Novembro
Timor-Leste